Nick Brown (born 3 September 1961) is a tennis coach and former professional tennis player from the United Kingdom.

Brown won the British Under-21 championship in 1980 and the national senior singles championship three years later in 1983. After playing on the ATP tour in the early 1980s, but tiring of his financial situation, he left the tour in 1984 to devote his time to coaching in Belgium and France and then young British players at David Lloyd's club in London, including Tim Henman.  Five years later, Brown came out of retirement to play in the Davis Cup.

Brown caused a sensation at Wimbledon in 1991 when he was granted a wild card. Ranked No. 591 in the world at the time, he faced the 10th seed and previous year's semi-finalist Goran Ivanišević in the second round and beat him in four sets, to the delight of the British crowd. Brown became the first Briton to beat a seeded player at Wimbledon since John Lloyd beat Eliot Teltscher in 1985. Brown was one of only five British players to beat a player inside the top 15 in a slam since 1990 until Daniel Evans at the 2013 US Open. The other four were Jeremy Bates, Tim Henman, Greg Rusedski and Andy Murray. 
Brown eventually lost in the third round to France's Thierry Champion.

Brown's career-high rankings were world No. 120 in singles and No. 25 in doubles.

Since permanently retiring from competitive tennis, Brown has served as coach of Britain's Fed Cup team.

In 2010, Brown was the Polish Davis Cup and Olympic tennis coach.

He is now married to Nadia Macari-Brown and currently Coaching Cambridge University Junior National and International players (Coaching 34 National Champions) 

Qualifications and Education 

LTA level 5 Master Performance Tennis Coach

Olympic and Grand Slam International Tennis Coach
 
Pan American University, Edinburgh, Texas Scholarship 

Coaching Experience 

GB Fed Cup Captain 1999-2005

Polish Olympic and Davis Cup Coach (7 years)

He has coached many international players including:

Iga Swaitek (World Number 1)

Tim Henman 

Elena Likhotseva 

Ai Sugiyama

Lukasz Kubot (World Number 1 Doubles Player)

Cara Black 

Marcin Matkowski and Mariusz Fyrstenberg (World Number 3)

Career finals

Singles (1)

Doubles (3)

References

External links
 
 
 

English tennis coaches
English male tennis players
Sportspeople from Warrington
Tennis people from Greater London
British male tennis players
1961 births
Living people